Frederick Charles Tillis (January 5, 1930 – May 3, 2020) was an American composer, jazz saxophonist, poet, and music educator at the collegiate level.

Early life

Growing up
Born in Galveston, Texas on January 5, 1930, Frederick Tillis was raised by his mother, Zelma Bernice Gardner,  Tillis (1913–2004), his stepfather, General Gardner, and his maternal grandparents, Willie Tillis and Jessie Tillis-Hubbard (1893–1979).

His first musical experiences were courtesy of his mother, who played piano and sang to him as a child.  Later, at George Washington Carver Elementary School, Tillis decided to join the school's drum and bugle corps.  As he became more proficient on trumpet, Tillis found his first professional job as a musician in jazz bands when he was twelve years old, earning him the nickname "Baby Tillis".  Tillis' band director at Central Side High School, Fleming S. Huff, suggested that he start playing the saxophone.

Post-secondary education
In 1946, Tillis was accepted at Wiley College on a music scholarship, and thus became the first person in his family to receive a college education.  He graduated from Wiley in 1949 with a B.A. in music, accepting the position of college band director there almost immediately.  He also married fellow Wiley music major Edna Louise Dillon at this time.  They moved from Texas in 1951 so that Tillis could attend the University of Iowa for graduate music studies.  At this time, he also decided to volunteer in the United States Air Force at the outbreak of the Korean War, and became director of the 356th Air Force Band.  He later went back to get his PhD under the GI Bill at University of North Texas College of Music, but then returned to the University of Iowa to finish his doctoral studies.

Career as educator and composer
Completing his PhD in 1963, Tillis then held a succession of academic positions at Wiley College, Grambling College, and Kentucky State University.  In 1970, Randolph Bromery recruited Tillis to the faculty of the University of Massachusetts Amherst, and he and his family moved to Massachusetts.  Joining the faculty as an associate professor of music, Tillis eventually held many faculty and administrative positions during his tenure at the University of Massachusetts.  He retired in 1997, but still held the title of Professor Emeritus in the Department of Music and Dance.  Tillis served as Director Emeritus of the University Fine Arts Center and Director of the Jazz in July Workshops in Improvisation at the University of Massachusetts Amherst.

Tillis wrote music since the age of twenty, and was influenced by Schoenberg, Bach, Prokofiev, Mussorgsky, African-American composers, and world music.  Some of Tillis' more notable compositions include A Symphony of Songs, a choral/orchestral work based on poems by Wallace Stevens and commissioned by The Hartford Chorale, Inc. (1999); A Festival Journey (1992), and Ring Shout Concerto (1974), for percussion, written for Max Roach; and Concerto for Piano (Jazz Trio) and symphony orchestra (1983) written for Billy Taylor.  Tillis also wrote several books of poetry, as well as the textbook Jazz Theory and Improvisation.

Late life 
During his retirement years, Dr. Tillis remained active as a composer, poet, touring performer, lecturer, and arts advocate. He maintained his dedicated service as director emeritus of the Fine Arts Center and professor emeritus at the UMass Amherst music department and Jazz in July program well into the mid-2000s. In the late life of Tillis, he suffered from dementia and had multiple people who would care for him in his old age. Despite his health challenges, he remained interested in life and continued to support and be engaged with various arts activites in the surrounding Western Massachusetts community.

Posthumous Honors

The outpouring of admiration and acknowledgements for Dr. Tillis and his accomplishments is steadfast. Notable honors include proclamations from both the Commonwealth of Massachusetts Senate and House of Representatives for his 50 years of cultural contributions to music education and arts advocacy in Massachusetts; the naming dedication of the 1,800 seat Fine Arts Center concert hall at the University of Massachusetts Amherst as the Frederick C. Tillis Performance Hall; and finally after restrictions were lifted as the pandemic eased, a major memorial celebration was able to be held on February 20, 2022 produced by the University of Massachusetts Amherst Department of Music and Dance. Performers included current music department faculty and students, former faculty and alumni of the music department, and many friends who collaborated with Dr. Tillis over the years. Additionally, music composed by Frederick Tillis continues to reach new audiences with even more performances, recordings, and recognition.

Compositions
 Autumn Concerto for Trumpet (1979) – Jazz orchestra. Duration: 10 minutes
 The Blue Express (1973) – Jazz orchestra. Duration: 5 minutes
 Blue Stone Differencia (1972) – Jazz orchestra. Duration: 5 minutes
 Brass Quintet (1962) – Duration: 10 minutes. Publisher: New York, General Music. Premiere: 1972; University of Iowa, Iowa City, Iowa. Recording: Serenus 12066 (1976)
 Celebration, Grand March (1966) – Concert band. Duration: ca. 5 minutes 30 seconds. Commissioned by Morehouse College, Atlanta, Georgia. Premiere: 1966; Morehouse College, Atlanta, GA
 Concerto for Piano (1977) – Jazz orchestra. Two parts. Duration: 19 minutes. Premiere: 1977; Fine Arts Center, University of Massachusetts Amherst, Amherst
 Concerto for Piano (1979) – Jazz trio and symphony orchestra. In two parts. Revised 1982. Duration: ca. 20 minutes. Commissioned by Springfield Symphony Orchestra. Written for Billy Taylor. Publisher: New York, Composer Facsimile Edition
 Concerto for Trio Pro Viva And Orchestra (1980) – Flute, violoncello, piano, and orchestra. Duration: 21 minutes 7 seconds. Commissioned by the Richmond Symphony Orchestra.
 The Cotton Curtain (1966) – Orchestra. Duration: 4 minutes 45 seconds. Publisher: New York, Composer Facsimile Edition. NOTE: Written for student orchestra.
 Designs for Orchestra, Nos. 1 and 2 (1963) – Duration: No. 1 ca. 7 minutes; No. 2 ca. 5 minutes 30 seconds. Publisher: New York, Composer Facsimile Edition. Premiere: 1968; Atlanta, Georgia; Atlanta Symphony Orchestra. NOTE: Ph.D. Dissertation; abstract in Dissertation Abstracts XXIX, 6, 2513. Can be performed separately
 Elegy (1983) – Jazz orchestra. Duration: 5 minutes 6 seconds. Commissioned by the Howard University Jazz Ensemble
 Fantasy on a Theme by Julian Adderley (A Little Taste) (1975) – Jazz orchestra. Duration: 10 minutes. Premiere: 4 November 1975; Amherst, Massachusetts; University of Massachusetts Amherst Jazz Workshop.
 Five Spirituals for Chorus and Brass Choir (1976) – Contents: 1. I'm Gonna Sing; 2. The Urgency; 3. Salve Savage in the Spin; 4. All About Are the Cold Places; 5. The Time. Duration: ca. 20 minutes. Text by Gwendolyn Brooks. Commissioned by the University of Massachusetts Amherst Choral. Publisher: New York, Composers Facsimile Edition. Premiere (Nos. 1, 3, 5): Summer 1976; University of Massachusetts Amherst Chorale on European tour.
 Freedom (1968) – SATB unaccompanied –  Duration: 8 minutes
 In a Spirited Mood (1961) – Brass quintet and baritone horn. Duration: 4 minutes 45 seconds. Publisher: New York, Joshua Corporation. Premiere: 1965; Grambling College, Grambling, Louisiana.
 In Memory of (1984) – Double quartet and trumpet, tenor saxophone, drum set, and string bass.
 In the Spirit and the Flesh (1985) – Orchestra and mixed chorus. Contents: 1. Life; 2. Every Time I Feel the Spirit. Duration: 20 minutes. Commissioned by the Atlanta Symphony Orchestra. Dedicated to Robert Shaw and the Memory of Dr. Martin Luther King Jr. Text: "Life" by Paul Laurence Dunbar. Score: CBMR.
 Inauguration Overture (1988) – Orchestra or concert band. Duration: ca. 6 minutes. Commissioned by Spelman College for the inauguration of Johnnetta Betsch Cole.
 Cor Variations (1977) – Jazz ensemble. Duration: 9 minutes 30 seconds. Premiere: 1977; University of Massachusetts Fine Arts Center; Amherst, MA.
 Metamorphosis on a "Scheme" By J.S.Bach (1972) – Jazz ensemble. Duration: ca. 5 minutes. Premiere: 1972; University of Massachusetts Amherst Jazz Workshop; Amherst, MA. NOTE: Written for a jazz workshop at the University of Massachusetts
 Militant Mood for Brass Sextet (1961) – Duration: ca. 4 minutes 45 seconds. Publisher: New York, Composers Facsimile Edition
 Motions for Trombone and Piano (1964) – Duration: ca. 10 minutes 30 seconds. Publisher: New York, Composers Facsimile Edition. Premiere: 1965; Contemporary Composers Forum; Illinois Wesleyan University; Bloomington, Illinois; Leroy Humphrey, trombone; Abraham Plum, piano. NOTE: Written for Leroy Humphrey
 Music for an Experimental Lab, Ensemble No. 2 (1967) – Soprano flute, 2 trumpets, piano. Duration: 2 minutes. Text: "Gloria." Premiere: 1968; Kentucky State College, Frankfort, Kentucky.
 Nayarac: Fantasy on Duke Ellington's Caravan (1974) – Jazz orchestra. Duration: ca. 6 minutes. Premiere: 1974; University of Massachusetts Amherst Jazz Workshop. NOTE: Written for jazz workshop at University of Massachusetts Amherst
 Niger Symphony (1975) – Chamber orchestra. In two parts. Duration: 13 minutes. Commissioned by the Hartford (Connecticut) Chamber Symphony Orchestra. Publisher: New York, Composer Facsimile Edition. Premiere: July 1975; Hartford, Connecticut; Hartford Chamber Orchestra; Daniel Parker, conductor
 Nobody Knows (1986) – Double quartet (string quartet, trumpet, tenor saxophone, drum set, string bass). Duration: 8 minutes 8 seconds
 One Dozen Rocks, Inc. (1971) – Jazz ensemble. Duration: 5 minutes 25 seconds. Premiere: 1971; University of Massachusetts Amherst Jazz Workshop. NOTE: Written for jazz workshop at University of Massachusetts Amherst
 Overture to a Dance for Concert Band (1961) – Duration: 10 minutes 30 seconds. Publisher: New York, Composers Facsimile Edition. Premiere: 1962; Wiley College; Marshall, Texas. NOTE: Short analysis in "Concert Band Music by Black-American Composers," The Black Perspective in Music 6.2 (Fall 1878):143–50, by Thomas Everett
 Passacaglia for Brass Quintet (1950) – Duration: 4 minutes. Publisher: New York, Joshua Corp. Premiere: 1950; Wiley College, Marshall, Texas
 Pastorale for Wind Ensemble (1974) – Duration: 8 minutes. Publisher: New York, Composers Facsimile Edition
 Quintet for Brass (1962) – Duration: 10 minutes. Publisher: New York, General Music Co
 Ring Shout Concerto for Percussionist And Orchestra (1973–74) – Duration: 20 minutes. Dedicated to Max Roach. Publisher: New York, Composer Facsimile Edition. Score: CBMR. Premiere: 1974; University of Massachusetts Amherst Symphony; Ronald Steele, conductor; Max Roach, soloist
 Saturn (1978) – Jazz orchestra. Duration: 8 minutes
 Secrets of the African Baobob (Variations for Modern Dance/Ballet) (1976) – Jazz orchestra. Duration: 10 minutes. Premiere: 1976; University of Massachusetts Amherst Fine Arts center; Amherst, Massachusetts
 Seton Concerto for Trumpet (1973) – Jazz orchestra. Duration: 9 minutes. Commissioned by Richard Williams, New York
 Spiritual Cycle (1978) – Soprano and orchestra. Text by Robert Hayden. Contents: 1. On Lookout Mountain; 2. Lord Riot; 3. And All the Atoms Cry Aloud. Duration: 15 minutes. Commissioned by the Fine Arts Center, University of Massachusetts. Score: CBMR
 Spiritual Fantasy No. 1 (1980) For piccolo, trumpet, and piano – Duration: 9 minutes 3 seconds. Commissioned by Fred Irby III, Washington. Publisher: New York, Composers Facsimile Edition
 Spiritual Fantasy No. 5 (1982) for horn and piano – Duration: 8 minutes
 Spiritual Fantasy No. 6 (1982) for trumpet and symphony orchestra –  Duration: 9 minutes
 Spiritual Fantasy No. 9 ("Sympathy") (1986) – for soprano solo, SATB, and brass quintet [text by Paul Laurence Dunbar] – Duration:  minutes
 Spiritual Fantasy No. 12 (1995) – for string quartet – Duration: 9 minutes
 Symphony In Three Movements (Nacirfa Nroh) (1969–70) – Duration: 15 minutes, 2 seconds
 Three Symphonic Spirituals (1978) – Orchestra. Duration: 11 minutes 6 seconds. Contents: 1. We Shall Overcome; 2. Deep River; 3. Swing Low, Sweet Chariot. Commissioned by Columbia Records. Score: CBMR
 Variants on a Theme by John Coltrane (Naima) (1979) – Jazz orchestra. Duration: 6 minutes 30 seconds

Poetry books by Tillis
 In the Spirit and the Flesh, E Publications (1989)
 Images of Mind and Heart E Publications (1991)
 In Celebration (1992)
 Of Moons, Moods, Myths, and the Muse, P&P Publications (1993) 
 Harlem Echoes (1995)
 Children's Corner: From A to Z (1997)
 Seasons, Symbols, and Stones (1999)
 Akiyoshidai Diary (2000)
 Scattered Ghosts and Southern Winds
 Bittersweet Harvests (2001) 
 Breaking Dawn and Healing (2005)
 The Nature of Things (2006)

Textbooks by Tillis
 Jazz Theory and Improvisation: A Manual of Keyboard, Instrumental (or vocal), and Aural Practice, Silhouette Music Corp., New York (1977)

Discography
 Frederick Tillis: Freedom, New World Records (1996)
 Motherless Child
 Spiritual Fantasy No. 12: Nobody Knows the Trouble I See
 Spiritual Fantasy No. 12: Wade in the Water
 Spiritual Fantasy No. 12: Crucifixian (He Never Said a Mumbelin' Word)
 Spiritual Fantasy No. 12: I'm A-Rollin'''
 Spiritual Fantasy No. 9 (Sympathy) Freedom Beyond Shades of Doubt The Rain Forest Singing for The Sake of My Soul The Best TimesReferences

Further reading
 Woodwind Music of Black Composers, by Aaron Horne (born 1940)
 New Music, by Eileen Southern (1920–2002), The Black Perspective in Music (journal), Vol. 3, Issue 1 (Spring 1975)
 Biographical Dictionary of Afro-American and African Musicians, by Eileen Southern (1920–2002), Greenwood Press, Westport, CT (1982)
 Charles Eugene Claghorn (1911–2005), Biographical Dictionary of American Music, Parker Publishing Co., West Nyack, New York (1973)
 Biography Index: A cumulative index to biographical material in books and magazines; Volume 14, September 1984 – August 1986, H. W. Wilson Company, New York (1986)
 Composium Directory of New Music: Annual index of contemporary compositions, 1982/83 edition, Crystal Musicworks, Sedro Woolley, WA (1983)
 Contemporary American Composers, A biographical dictionary, First edition, compiled by E. Ruth Anderson (born 1928), Boston: G.K. Hall & Co., Boston (1976)
 Contemporary American Composers, A biographical dictionary, Second edition, compiled by E. Ruth Anderson (born 1928), Boston: G.K. Hall & Co., Boston (1982)
 Composers Corner, by Ellistine Perkins Holly (born 1934), CBMR Digest, Center for Black Music Research, Columbia College Chicago, Vol 2, Issue 1 (Spring 1989)
 Contemporary American Composers Based at American Colleges and Universities, by c, Paradise Arts Publisher, Paradise, California (1975)
 The New Grove Dictionary of American Music, by Carman Moore (born 1936), editors:  Hugh Wiley Hitchcock (1923–2007) and Stanley Sadie (1930–2005), 4 volumes, Macmillan Publishers, London, and Grove's Dictionary of Music, 1986, New York, Vol 4, pp 394–395
 Fifteen Black American Composers: A Bibliography of Their Works, Alice Tischler, Detroit Studies in Music Bibliography, Information Coordinators, Detroit (1981)

External links
 
 
 Frederick C Tillis at American Composers Alliance 
 Frederick C Tillis article at Encyclopedia.com
 Frederick C Tillis UMass Amherst faculty biography
 Frederick C Tillis NY Times Obituary 
 University of Massachusetts Dr. Frederick C. Tillis Memorial Campaign [https://minutefund.umass.edu/project/22288

1930 births
2020 deaths
People from Galveston, Texas
African-American jazz composers
American jazz composers
African-American jazz musicians
Wiley College alumni
University of Iowa alumni
University of North Texas College of Music alumni
University of Massachusetts Amherst faculty
Wiley College faculty
Grambling State University faculty
Kentucky State University faculty
People from Amherst, Massachusetts
Jazz musicians from Massachusetts
Jazz musicians from Texas
Military personnel from Texas
20th-century African-American people
21st-century African-American people